Berlin is a 2009 play by David Hare, in the form of a 55-minute monologue on Berlin and its history. It was first performed in March 2009 at the Royal National Theatre by the author himself, directed by Stephen Daldry.

External links
https://web.archive.org/web/20110530050923/http://www.nationaltheatre.org.uk/42719/productions/berlin.html

Plays by David Hare
2009 plays
Plays for one performer
Monodrama
History of Berlin
Berlin in fiction